Zanoge Hill (‘Halm Zanoge’ \'h&lm za-'no-ge\) is the ice-covered hill rising to 710 m and forming the northwest extremity of Srednogorie Heights on Trinity Peninsula in Graham Land, Antarctica.  It is surmounting Malorad Glacier to the east and north.

The hill is named after the settlements of Zanoge in Western Bulgaria.

Location
German-British mapping in 1996.

Maps
 Trinity Peninsula. Scale 1:250000 topographic map No. 5697. Institut für Angewandte Geodäsie and British Antarctic Survey, 1996.
 Antarctic Digital Database (ADD). Scale 1:250000 topographic map of Antarctica. Scientific Committee on Antarctic Research (SCAR), 1993–2016.

References
 Zanoge Hill. SCAR Composite Antarctic Gazetteer
 Bulgarian Antarctic Gazetteer. Antarctic Place-names Commission. (details in Bulgarian, basic data in English)

External links
 Zanoge Hill. Copernix satellite image

Hills of Trinity Peninsula
Bulgaria and the Antarctic